The following is a list of places in the Tayside region of Scotland.


A
Aberfeldy
Alyth
Arbroath
Auchterarder

B
Balnaboth
Birnim
Blairgowrie
Brechin
Bridge of Cally

C
Carnoustie
Comrie
Crieff

D
Dundee
Dunkeld

E
Edzell

F
Ferryden by Montrose
Forfar

G
Glencarse
Glendoick
Glenfarg

K
Kinloch Rannoch
Kinross
Kirriemuir

L
Letham

M
Monifieth
Monikie
Montrose

P
Perth
Pitlochry

Geography of Scotland
Tayside region
Tayside